Briançon station (French: Gare de Briançon) is a French railway station serving the town Briançon, Hautes-Alpes department, southeastern France. It is the eastern terminus of the Veynes–Briançon railway.

Train services
The following services call at Briançon:
night services (Intercités de nuit) Paris - Gap - Briançon
regional services (TER Auvergne-Rhône-Alpes) Valence - Gap - Briançon
regional services (TER Provence-Alpes-Côte d'Azur) Marseille - Aix-en-Provence - Gap - Briançon

References

Railway stations in Provence-Alpes-Côte d'Azur
Railway stations in France opened in 1884